Six Books can refer to:

 Six major Hadith collections in Islam
 the Six Books (《诗》、《书》、《礼》、《乐》、《易》、《春秋》) that substituted Six Arts in the early Chinese education curriculum